The National Communications Authority of Somalia (NCA) is the regulatory body for the communications sector in Somalia. NCA was established through the Communications Act of 2017 and its mandate is to regulate the Communications sector including telecommunications, Internet, broadcasting, ICT (Information, and Communications Technology) and e-commerce.

The NCA is responsible for facilitating the development of the ICT sector, enabling and ensuring fair and sustainable competition, carrier interconnection, transparency in the implementation of the Communication Law, protecting consumer interest and rights, and maintaining its role as an independent regulator.

On 19 November 2022, the Prime MInister of Somalia Mr Hamza Abdi Barre appointed Mr. Mustafa  Sheik as the General Manager of the National Communications Authority of Somalia

Interconnection Agreement
On December 5, 2022, NCA General Manager Mustafa  Sheik and the Somali telecommunication companies signed an interconnection agreement, allowing customers of the various telecom operators in the country to call each other across different networks.

See also
 List of telecommunications regulatory bodies

References

External links
The NCA Website

Communications in Somalia
Government of Somalia